Ironhorse was a Canadian rock band from Vancouver, formed by Randy Bachman, the former The Guess Who and Bachman-Turner Overdrive guitarist and singer.  The initial incarnation of the band also included Tom Sparks (vocals, guitars), 
John Pierce (bass) and Mike Baird (drums).

This line-up of Ironhorse released 1979's Ironhorse album on the Scotti Brothers label, and had a minor U.S. hit single in April 1979 with "Sweet Lui-Louise", which peaked at #36 on the Billboard Hot 100 chart. In Canada, the song peaked slightly higher at #26. The same track reached #60 in the UK Singles Chart.

Ironhorse then had an almost complete line-up change, retaining only Bachman.  The second incarnation of Ironhorse consisted of Frank Ludwig (lead vocals, guitars); Bachman (guitars, vocals); Ron Foos (bass) and Chris Leighton (drums).  This line-up issued 1980's Everything is Grey, also on Scotti Brothers Records. One of its singles, "What's Your Hurry Darlin'," peaked at #84 in Canada. In the U.S., the song peaked at #89 in May 1980.

Foos then left the group to rejoin Paul Revere and the Raiders. In 1980, Ironhorse disbanded, with the remaining members (Bachman/Leighton/Ludwig) forming Union with Bachman's former Bachman-Turner Overdrive band-mate Fred Turner. Union put out one album On Strike on the CBS subsidiary Portrait Records, and had a minor hit with the track "Mainstreet U.S.A."

As of May 2013, Randy Bachman has been able to secure the rights to the two Ironhorse albums.

Discography

Ironhorse - Scotti Brothers (1979)

Track listing 
"One and Only" (Randy Bachman) - 3:32
"Sweet Lui-Louise" (Randy Bachman) - 3:11
"Jump Back In The Light" (Randy Bachman) - 3:11
"You Gotta Let Go" (Randy Bachman) - 4:00
"Tumbleweed" (Randy Bachman) - 3:19
"Stateline Blues" (Tom Sparks) - 3:47
"Watch Me Fly" (Tom Sparks) - 3:41
"Old Fashioned" (Randy Bachman) - dedicated to Slowhand - 3:10
"She's Got It" (Tom Sparks) - 3:12
"There Ain't No Cure" (Randy Bachman) - 3:57

Personnel 
Randy Bachman - vocals, guitars
Tom Sparks - vocals, guitars
John Pierce - bass
Mike Baird - drums

Everything is Grey - Scotti Brothers (1980)

Track listing 
"What's Your Hurry Darlin'" (Randy Bachman, Carl Wilson) - 4:28
"Everything Is Grey" (Randy Bachman) - 4:09
"Symphony" (Randy Bachman, Tom Sparks) - 3:24
"Only Way To Fly" (Frank Ludwig) - 3:56
"Try A Little Harder" (Randy Bachman, Frank Ludwig) - 3:30
"I'm Hurtin' Inside" (Randy Bachman) - 3:59
"Playin' That Same Old Song" (Randy Bachman, Frank Ludwig) - 3:50
"Railroad Love" (Randy Bachman) - 3:40
"Somewhere, Sometime"  (Randy Bachman, Frank Ludwig) - 3:55
"Keep Your Motor Running" (Randy Bachman) - 3:44

Personnel 
Frank Ludwig - lead vocals, keyboards
Randy Bachman - vocals, guitars
Ron Foos - bass
Chris Leighton - drums
with:
Tom Sparks - backup vocals and guitar

See also

List of bands from Canada
List of 1970s one-hit wonders in the United States

References

External links
[ Ironhorse] at Allmusic

Musical groups established in 1979
Musical groups from Vancouver
Canadian rock music groups
1979 establishments in British Columbia